Luz María Zornoza Roca Rey (born 15 October 1994) is a Peruvian badminton player. She competed at the 2015 Pan American Games.

Career 
In 2016, Zornoza won silver medal at the Pan Am Badminton Championships in the women's doubles, and bronze medals in mixed doubles and team events.

Achievements

Pan Am Championships 
Women's doubles

Mixed doubles

BWF International Challenge/Series 
Women's singles

Women's doubles

Mixed doubles

  BWF International Challenge tournament
  BWF International Series tournament
  BWF Future Series tournament

References

External links 
 
 

1994 births
Living people
Peruvian female badminton players
Badminton players at the 2015 Pan American Games
Pan American Games competitors for Peru
21st-century Peruvian women